Delson station is a commuter rail station operated by Exo in Delson, Quebec, Canada. It is served by  the Candiac line.

Local transit connections 
 CIT Roussillon route 36

References

External links
 Delson Commuter Train Station Information (RTM)
 Delson Commuter Train Station Schedule (RTM)

Exo commuter rail stations
Railway stations in Montérégie
Railway stations in Canada opened in 2001
2001 establishments in Quebec
Rail transport in Roussillon Regional County Municipality